Extinction Level Event: The Final World Front is the third studio album by American rapper Busta Rhymes. It was released on December 15, 1998 by Flipmode and Elektra Records in North America. The album follows the apocalyptic theme explored by Rhymes' first two albums, The Coming (1996) and When Disaster Strikes (1997). Musically, the album comprises East Coast, West Coast, horrorcore, and hardcore hip hop music.

Widely praised by critics, the album earned three Grammy Award nominations: Best Rap Album, Best Rap Solo Performance and Best Rap Performance by a Duo or Group at the 42nd Grammy Awards. It also spawned three Billboard chart hits, including the Janet Jackson-featuring "What's It Gonna Be?!", which became Rhymes' highest-charting single on the US Billboard Hot 100 as a lead artist, reaching number three. In early 1999, E.L.E. was certified Platinum by the Recording Industry Association of America (RIAA) for selling over one million copies.

Critical reception
The album received generally favorable reviews. At the 42nd Grammy Awards, the album earned three nominations, one for the album itself in the category of Best Rap Album, a Best Rap Solo Performance nomination for "Gimme Some More" and a Best Rap Performance by a Duo or Group nomination for "What's It Gonna Be?!" with Janet Jackson.

In August 2020, Busta Rhymes announced a sequel to the album, Extinction Level Event 2: The Wrath of God, which was released on October 30, 2020.

Commercial performance
The album debuted at number twelve on the official US Billboard 200 album chart, remaining on the chart for thirty-two weeks. E.L.E. peaked at the number two spot on the R&B/Hip-Hop Albums chart, peaking inside the top fifty for thirty-five weeks. In the United Kingdom, E.L.E. entered at number fifty-four on the official UK Albums Chart, charting for seven weeks. On January 8, 1999, the album was certified Platinum by the Recording Industry Association of America (RIAA) for shipping 1,000,000 copies.

Album cover
The album, and cover were influenced by popular disaster movies around the time of the album's release in 1998, primarily Armageddon and Deep Impact. Busta Rhymes explained in an interview that the cover was inspired by the disaster movie Deep Impact, showing his image of an asteroid hitting New York City.

Track listing

Charts

Year-end charts

Certifications

References 

1998 albums
Busta Rhymes albums
Horrorcore albums
Elektra Records albums
Albums produced by Swizz Beatz
Albums produced by Nottz
Albums produced by DJ Scratch
Albums produced by Rockwilder